Killang Hill is a hill in the Northeastern part of Nigeria. It is located in Popandi village in Kaltungo, Gombe State. The site is used for farming, hunting, and tourism.

References 

Gombe State
Tourist attractions in Nigeria
Nigeria articles missing geocoordinate data